The Attorney General of Ghana is the chief legal advisor to the Ghanaian government. The attorney general is also responsible for the Ministry of Justice. The Attorney General also serves as a member of the General Legal Council which regulates legal practice in Ghana.

List of ministers
The current Attorney General is Mr. Godfred Yeboah Dame. He was appointed by President Nana Addo Danquah Akufo-Addo in 2021.

See also

Justice ministry
General Legal Council
Ministry of Justice (Ghana)
Politics of Ghana

References

External links and sources

Politics of Ghana
Attorney General